is a railway station in the city of Tochigi, Tochigi, Japan, operated by the private railway operator Tōbu Railway. The station is numbered "TN-10".

Lines

Station layout
This station consists of two island platforms serving four tracks, connected to the station building by a footbridge.

Platforms

Adjacent stations

History
Shin-Ōhirashita Station opened on 1 November 1931.

From 17 March 2012, station numbering was introduced on all Tōbu lines, with Shin-Ōhirashita Station becoming "TN-10".

Passenger statistics
In fiscal 2019, the station was used by an average of 2722 passengers daily (boarding passengers only).

Surrounding area
 Former Ōhira town hall
 Ōhira Post Office
 Ōhira Culture Center
 Ōhira Public Library
 Ōhira Sports Center

See also
 List of railway stations in Japan

References

External links

 Shin-Ōhirashita Station information 

Railway stations in Tochigi Prefecture
Stations of Tobu Railway
Railway stations in Japan opened in 1931
Tobu Nikko Line
Tochigi, Tochigi